Dicrodon holmbergi, Holmberg's desert tegu , is a species of teiid lizard endemic to Peru.

References

Dicrodon
Reptiles described in 1957
Taxa named by Karl Patterson Schmidt